The Common Business Communication Language (CBCL) is a communications language proposed by John McCarthy that foreshadowed much of XML. The language consists of a basic framework of hierarchical markup derived from S-expressions, coupled with some general principles about use and extensibility. Although written in 1975, the proposal was not published until 1982, and to this day remains relatively obscure.

External links
 John McCarthy's original CBCL proposal, webified and with a 1998 appendix considering some of the then-current work going on with XML and other communications languages.

Data modeling languages